Jean Muir (born Jean Muir Fullarton; February 13, 1911 – July 23, 1996) was an American stage and film actress and educator. She was the first performer to be blacklisted after her name appeared in the anti-Communist 1950 pamphlet Red Channels.

Early years
An only child, Muir was born in Suffern, New York as Jean Muir Fullarton; her father was a certified public accountant, and her mother was a substitute teacher. She attended the Dwight School in Englewood, New Jersey.

Career
Muir's Broadway debut came in The Truth Game (1930) at age 19. She was a model for the Walter Thornton Model Agency in New York during the early 1930s. She was signed by Warner Bros. in 1933 and made 14 films in her first three years there. She played opposite several famous actors including Warren William, Paul Muni, Richard Barthelmess and Franchot Tone, but she returned to Broadway in 1937 because she was unsatisfied with the roles. She appeared occasionally in films through 1943. She was also one of the candidates for the role of Melanie in Gone with the Wind.

Muir incurred the disfavor of studio executives because of her involvement in formation of the Screen Actors Guild, her tendency to question the way the film business operated, and her resistance to posing for publicity photographs.

Blacklist 
In 1950 Muir was named as a Communist sympathizer by the notorious pamphlet Red Channels, and immediately removed from the cast of the television sitcom The Aldrich Family, in which she had been cast as Mrs. Aldrich. NBC had received between 20 and 30 phone calls protesting her being in the show. General Foods, the sponsor, said that it would not sponsor programs in which "controversial persons" were featured. Though the company later received thousands of calls protesting the decision, it was not reversed.

Muir was the first performer to be deprived of employment because of a listing in Red Channels. The apparent cause of the accusation was her six-month membership in the Congress of American Women, which federal authorities considered a subversive group.

Later years 
Muir resumed acting in 1958, appearing in an episode of Matinee Theater on NBC-TV.

After teaching drama and directing plays at two community centers in New York, Muir moved to Missouri in 1968 and became the Master Acting Teacher at Stephens College, in addition to directing several productions there. She also completed her college degree at Stephens in 1977. Reaching Stephens' mandatory retirement age forced her to stop teaching there, and in 1981 she had a one-year appointment to teach at the University of Missouri–Kansas City.

Personal life
On December 20, 1940, Muir married entertainment attorney, and later television producer, Henry Jaffe in New York. They had three children. In the mid-1950s she reportedly suffered from alcoholism and cirrhosis of the liver.

Death 
Muir died in a nursing home in Mesa, Arizona on July 23, 1996 at the age of 85.

Recognition 
Muir has a star on the Hollywood Walk of Fame at 6280 Hollywood Blvd.

Filmography

Film

Television

References

External links

 
 
 
 
 Jean Muir at Virtual history
 Jean Muir Papers at the University of Oregon Libraries  

1911 births
1996 deaths
American film actresses
American radio actresses
American television actresses
American stage actresses
Hollywood blacklist
Actresses from New York City
20th-century American actresses
People from Suffern, New York